Regina Lamendella is an American Professor of Microbiology.  She is best known for the use of omics for applied studies of microbiology in natural waterways and the guts of animals, including humans.

Lamendella collaborates with and leads teams of scientist and healthcare professionals developing novel approaches to identify and screen for microorganisms in diverse environments, from waterways to human tissue. For example, her work suggests that eating walnuts may be good for human gut flora, resulting in improved heart health. Lamendella has also contributed to local testing for COVID-19 among rural Amish communities.

Education 
Lamendella earned her B.A. in biology from Lafayette College. From the University of Cincinnati, she earned a M.S. in environmental science, a M.S. in molecular biology, and in 2009 she completed her PhD. From 2009-2012, she completed postdoctoral studies at Lawrence Livermore National Laboratory.

Employment 
In 2012, Lamendella joined the faculty of Juniata College, where she is currently an Associate Professor and holds the George '75 and Cynthia '76 Valko Professorship in Biological Sciences.

Bibliography 
Lamendella has more than 50 publications listed on Scopus that have been cited a total of more than 4,000 times, giving her an h-index of 23. Her most cited articles include:
<li>
<li>
<li>

References

External links 

Environmental scientists
Living people
University of Cincinnati alumni
Juniata College faculty
Year of birth missing (living people)
American microbiologists
Women microbiologists
Lafayette College alumni
Place of birth missing (living people)
20th-century American biologists
American women biologists
American women academics
21st-century American women
20th-century American women scientists